Marc Michel (February 10, 1929 – 3 November 2016) was a French-Swiss actor. He appeared in more than fifty films.

He is best known for his roles in three seminal French films of the 1960s: Jacques Becker's Le Trou (1960), and two films by Jacques Demy: Lola (1961) and The Umbrellas of Cherbourg (1964). In both Demy films, he played the same role, Roland Cassard, a lovesick writer and jeweler.

Filmography

References

External links 

1932 births
2016 deaths
Swiss male film actors